Candid may refer to:
 Candid (app), a mobile app for anonymous discussions
 Candid (organization), providing information on US nonprofit companies
 Candid Records, a record label
 Ilyushin Il-76, NATO reporting name Candid, a Soviet aircraft
 Candid photography
 Impartiality
 Honesty

See also 
 Candida (disambiguation)
 Candide (disambiguation)